Max Cooper (born 1980) is a London-based electronica and techno producer who has been releasing music since 2007. He has received positive reviews from magazines such as Clash and critical acclaim for his debut album Human.

Cooper has released more than seventy original tracks and remixes, and more than twenty accompanying video works, primarily on London label FIELDS and German label Traum Schallplatten. His remixes range from avant-garde composers Michael Nyman and Nils Frahm, to bands like Hot Chip and Au Revoir Simone, to techno acts such as Agoria, Sasha (Welsh DJ) and Guy Andrews.

Early life and education
Cooper was born in Belfast, Northern Ireland to parents of Australian descent. He attended the Holywood Steiner School and was inspired to become a geneticist after reading various science books as a child. Although he did not receive formal music training, Cooper started playing violin at age 12, but eventually stopped: "I never enjoyed it [violin] and didn't pursue it to any great degree—the music wasn't right to be honest."

Cooper received his PhD in computational biology from the University of Nottingham in 2008. During his doctoral training, his research interests focused on modelling the evolution of gene regulatory networks—he specifically examined the evolution of feed-forward loops, and studied the evolutionary influences of binding site organisation during transcriptional processes. After completing his doctoral work, Cooper held a brief post-doctoral position as a geneticist at University College London.

Career

Music

In 2010, Cooper decided to focus entirely on music production and his music is influenced by his science background. In terms of musical references, Cooper has cited Jon Hopkins, Sigur Rós and Ólafur Arnalds, adding that his influences are "mainly electronica more than techno". By 2012, he was voted in the top 20 live acts of the year for two years running on Resident Advisor and named a Beatport artist of the year.

Cooper released a two-part EP, Conditions One, on 10 December 2012, which also featured Braids, Ghosting Season and D/R/U/G/S (a.k.a. Callum Wright). That same month, he achieved the number 5 spot on BeatPort's "Top Artists of 2012" and was voted a "top 20" live act by the readers of canonical electronic music website Resident Advisor.

Cooper encourages fans to produce their own videos for his music, with the results displayed on his website. He released a music video for the song "Pleasures" that was animated by artist Cédric de Smedt.

Cooper revealed that some of the artwork on his album covers was inspired by his flatmate, who is a graphic designer.

In December 2013, Cooper announced the release date of his debut album Human as 10 March 2014. The album was preceded by the single "Adrift", which was released on 16 December 2013. In regard to "Adrift", Cooper explained that it is "more of a personal piece of music for me than a club track, which is the approach I’ve taken for the whole album". Human received critical acclaim and was described by Clash as "sumptuous, enticingly beautiful". The release was followed by two remix EPs, Inhuman One and Inhuman Two, with remixes from Rodriguez Jr., Lusine, Harvey McKay, Jack Dixon and Olaf Stuut.

In September 2014, Cooper launched his debut audiovisual show Emergence at the Decibel Festival in Seattle.  Performed entirely live and solo, it is a one-man show that ties together his scientific, experimental, musical and visual interests in a single conceptual festival artwork and is on tour in Europe.

In early December 2014, Cooper released his follow-up to Human, the "Kindred EP" featuring singer Kathrin deBoer from trip-hop band Belleruche and remixes from David August and Throwing Snow. The EP features Cooper's experiments with the sansula instrument and the polyphonic analogue Prophet 08 synth and was described by Fact as a "gorgeous slice of electronica". During the summer before the Kindred release, Cooper released "Tileyard Improvisations Vol. 1", a collaboration fusing jazz and electronica.

Max Cooper released his second collaboration with classically trained pianist Tom Hodge, "Artefact" as well as a remix EP of the same name. The music combines piano music with electronica and glitch and was inspired in part by an excursion Cooper made to the Teotihuacan pyramids in Mexico.

Glassforms, a collaboration between Cooper and Bruce Brubaker, featuring the work of Philip Glass, was released 5 June 2020. According to Cooper, "It was a refreshing process coming from my usual approach of mousing around music projects, building things in tiny iterations at a time, and it fed into my solo project techniques a lot as well."

Live performance
Cooper has gained an international reputation as a leading electronic composer for both his unique sound and immersive audio- visual live shows.

Cooper has performed at numerous festivals, including Glastonbury Festival, Fuji Rock Festival, Bestival, Latitude Festival, Awakenings Festival, MUTEK, Amsterdam Dance Event and Decibel Festival. He has also performed live with artists such as Echaskech and Baltimoroder.

Other projects
As of 2011, Cooper is working with software company Liine on music-production software that is influenced by science. In December 2012, he wrote a blog for British music magazine NME.

Equipment
Cooper uses Ableton equipment and Akai APC40 controllers. He is also an early adopter of unusual club sound systems, performing in August 2013 on a 3D sound system called "4DSOUND".

Selected discography

Studio albums
 Human (2014)
 Emergence (25 November 2016)
Balance (a Mix Project) (4 May 2018)
One Hundred Billion Sparks (20 September 2018)
Yearning for the Infinite (7 November 2019)
Glassforms (5 June 2020)
Unspoken Words (25 March 2022)

Singles and EPs

Remixes

References

External links
 
 Official YouTube channel
 Management company official website

Living people
Musicians from Belfast
DJs from Belfast
English electronic musicians
English DJs
Alumni of the University of Nottingham
Alumni of University College London
1980 births
Electronic dance music DJs